Voight is a variant of the German surname Vogt.

People
Notable people with the surname include:

 Barry Voight (born 1937), American geologist 
 Charles Voight (1887–1947), American cartoonist
 Dutch Voight (1888–1986), American gangster
 Hank Voight, fictional character in the TV series Chicago P.D.
 Jack Voight (born 1945), former State Treasurer of Wisconsin
 Jon Voight (born 1938), American actor
 Robert G. Voight (1921–2008), American academic 
 James Haven (born 1973), American actor and producer born James Haven Voight; son of Jon Voight
 Angelina Jolie (born 1975), American actress and director born Angelina Jolie Voight; daughter of Jon Voight
 Chip Taylor (born 1940), American songwriter born James Wesley Voight

Characters
 Hank Voight, a fictional character from Chicago P.D.
 Janelle Voight, a fictional character from Terminator 2: Judgment Day, John Connor's foster mother and T-1000 alterego
 Todd Voight, a fictional character from Terminator 2: Judgment Day, John Connor's foster father

See also 

 
 Voigt
 Vogt
 Vogt (surname)
 Voet (surname)
 Voigt pipe
 Voight-Kampff machine
Voight-Kampff test

German-language surnames
Occupational surnames